Statistics of Bulgarian National Football Division in the 1937–38 season.

Overview
It was contested by 10 teams, and Ticha Varna won the championship.

League standings

Results

References
Bulgaria - List of final tables (RSSSF)

Bulgarian State Football Championship seasons
Bul
1937–38 in Bulgarian football